Gramellini is an Italian surname. Notable people with the surname include:

Gilberto Gramellini (1930–2013), Italian wrestler
Massimo Gramellini (born 1960), Italian writer and journalist

Italian-language surnames